Selemon Barega Shirtaga (born 20 January 2000) is an Ethiopian long-distance runner. He won the gold medal in the 10,000 metres at the 2020 Tokyo Olympics and a silver for the 5000 metres at the 2019 World Championships in Doha. Barega is a two-time 3000 metres World Indoor Championship medallist, taking silver in 2018, and a gold in 2022.

He won gold medals at the 2016 World Under-20 Championships (5000m), and 2017 World U18 Championships (3000m). Barega represented Ethiopia in the 5000m at the 2017 World Championships in London, finishing fifth in the final.

Career
Selemon was born in the Gurage area of Ethiopia.

He began competing internationally in 2016. On 23 July, he won the 5000 metres at the World U20 Championships in Bydgoszcz, Poland with a time of 13:21.21.

2017–18
In 2017, Selemon competed in the junior race of the World Cross Country Championships, finishing fifth. He won the African U20 Championships in Tlemcen, Algeria over 5000 m clocking 13:51.43 on 2 July.

On 6 July, Selemon clocked his first sub-13 minute 5000 m at the Lausanne Diamond League meeting, placing second in 12:55.58. On 16 July, he won the 3000 m at the Nairobi World U18 Championships, clocking 7:47.16. At the 2017 World Championships in Athletics in London, he placed fifth in the men's 5000 m final in a time of 13:35.34; the race was won by his compatriot Muktar Edris.

In 2018, Selemon placed second over the 3000 m at the World Indoor Championships in Birmingham, United Kingdom, clocking a time of 8:15.59 on 4 March. On 25 May, he won the two mile race at the Prefontaine Classic in Eugene, Oregon. His next major championship was on 14 July at the World U20 Championships in Tampere, Finland, where he placed fourth in 13:21.16. On 31 August, Selemon set a world U20 record in the 5000 m at the Brussels Diamond League clocking a time of 12:43.02. This performance ranked him as the fifth fastest 5000 m performer of all time, behind Joshua Cheptegei, Kenenisa Bekele, Haile Gebrselassie, and Daniel Komen.

2019–20
Selemon competed in the senior men's race of the World Cross Country Championships in Aarhus, Denmark. He placed fourth and was the first Ethiopian to finish in a race won by Uganda's Joshua Cheptegei. He placed second at the Shanghai Diamond League on 18 May and the Rome Diamond League on 6 June. On 13 June, Selemon won the 3000 m at the Bislett Games in Oslo, Norway, clocking 7:32.17. On 30 June, he placed third over two miles at the Prefontaine Classic in Eugene, Oregon with a time of 8:08.69. On 5 July, he was second at the Lausanne Diamond League, clocking 13:01.99 in the 5000 m. On 17 July, Selemon was second at the Ethiopian Trials in Hengelo, Netherlands in a personal best time of 26:49.46, finishing behind Hagos Gebrhiwet. On 29 August, he was fifth over the 5000 m at the Zürich Diamond League. On 27 September, he won his heat of the men's 5000 m at the 2019 World Championships in Athletics in Doha, Qatar. On 30 September, he finished second in the final in 12:59.70, outsprinted by compatriot Muktar Edris.

In February 2020, Selemon competed at several indoor track races in Europe. His next race was on 8 September at the Golden Spike Ostrava, where he contested the 5000 m, placing second with a time of 12:49.08. Despite attempting to sprint pass Jacob Kiplimo in the final 100 m, the Ugandan held on to win in a time of 12:48.63. Selemon next raced the 1500 m at the Galà dei Castelli in Switzerland, placing third at 3:36.07 on 15 September. At the Doha Diamond League on 25 September, he raced 1500 m in 3:32.97, placing second. He headed back to Ethiopia, where on 26 December, he ran 1500 m at the Ethiopian Clubs Competition in Addis Ababa, winning in 3:38.1.

2021–present
In 2021, Selemon won the Olympic candidate trial competition in Addis Ababa, recording a time of 27:58.5. He competed at several indoor track races in January and February, including a 7:26.10 3000 m, clocking him second place behind compatriot Getnet Wale. He became the third fastest performer in history over the indoor 3000 m with his performance, behind Kenya's Daniel Komen, who clocked 7:24.90 on 6 February 1998, and Wale, who won the race in 7:24.98. Selemon next raced two indoor 1500 m races on the World Athletics Indoor Tour winning both, first at the Copernicus Cup in Toruń, Poland he clocked a 3:32.97 on 17 February, and then on 24 February, a 3:35.42 performance in Madrid, Spain. His performance in Toruń made him the eighth fastest performer of all time in the indoor 3000 m. Selemon's first outdoor track 5000 m race of the year came in Bergamo, Italy on 12 May, where he clocked 13:02.47, beaten by Kenya's Mark Owon Lomuket. Selemon next raced at the Ethiopian Trials in Hengelo, where he won the 10,000 m in a time of 26:49.51  holding off Yomif Kejelcha who was second, Berihu Aregawi placed third. The race was tactical, with Selemon putting in surges and then slowing down before it came down to a last lap sprint finish.

On 30 July 2021, at the age of 21, Selemon won the 10,000 m at the 2020 Tokyo Olympics, outsprinting world record holder Joshua Cheptegei and World Half Marathon champion Jacob Kiplimo of Uganda to win in 27:43.22. Brutal humidity meant that the winning time of 27:43.22 was the slowest in an Olympic final since 1992, but Barega's close was sublime as he ripped the last kilometer in 2:24.9 and last lap in 53.94. This win made him the fourth Ethiopian to win the 10,000 m title at the Olympics, the other three being Kenenisa Bekele (2004, 2008), Haile Gebrselassie (1996, 2000), and Miruts Yifter (1980).

Achievements

International competitions

Personal bests
 1500 metres – 3:32.97 (Doha 2020)
 1500 metres indoor – 3:32.97 (Torun 2021)
 3000 metres – 7:32.17 (Oslo 2019)
 3000 metres indoor – 7:26.10 (Liévin 2021)
 Two miles – 8:08.69 (Stanford, CA 2019) World under-20 best
 5000 metres – 12:43.02 (Brussels 2018) World under-20 record
 10000 metres - 26:44.73 (Hengelo 2022)

Circuit wins and titles, National titles
 Diamond League 5000 metres champion:  2018
 2018 – Eugene Prefontaine Classic (two miles), Stockholm Bauhaus-Galan (5000m), Brussels Memorial Van Damme (5000m)
 2019 – Oslo Bislett Games (3000m)
 2022 – Paris Meeting (5000m)
 Ethiopian Athletics Championships
 10,000 metres: 2019

References

External links

 

2000 births
Living people
Ethiopian male long-distance runners
World Athletics Championships athletes for Ethiopia
World Athletics Championships medalists
Diamond League winners
World Youth Championships in Athletics winners
Ethiopian Athletics Championships winners
Olympic gold medalists for Ethiopia
Athletes (track and field) at the 2020 Summer Olympics
Medalists at the 2020 Summer Olympics
Olympic gold medalists in athletics (track and field)
People from Gurage Zone
Sportspeople from Southern Nations, Nationalities, and Peoples' Region
Olympic athletes of Ethiopia
World Athletics Indoor Championships winners
21st-century Ethiopian people